Teddy Jusuf (Deyi Xiong) (born Him Tek Jie) is a retired brigadier general of the Indonesian National Armed Forces (TNI), Indonesia's armed forces.  He is the first Chinese Indonesian to attain this rank in the TNI.

Currently, Jusuf is chairman of the Chinese Indonesian Social Association (Paguyuban Sosial Marga Tionghoa Indonesia).

Early life
Jusuf was born Him Tek Ji in  Bogor, Indonesia to a migrant-born father and an Indonesian-born mother, both of Chinese descent.

He was ten years old when he saw the soldiers at an Indonesian military camp stationed near his school in North Jakarta where he grew up. When he saw them training, he decided he want to become an Indonesian soldier.

Tek Ji attended both national and Chinese language schools as a boy and speaks Mandarin besides his native language Indonesian.

Military career
Him Tek Ji enrolled in the Indonesian Military Academy when he finished secondary school. He graduated in 1965 as Lt. Teddy Jusuf.

Despite enduring a lot of discrimination in his early days in the army, Jusuf rose through the ranks, becoming a brigadier general in 1983 and even serving as a senior staff member in army intelligence. Jusuf attributes his success to hard work, discipline, and patience, qualities which would serve him well later in establishing the Chinese Indonesian Social Association.

External links
 Teddy, a voice for ethnic Chinese

1944 births
Hakka generals
Indonesian generals
Indonesian people of Chinese descent
Indonesian National Military Academy alumni
Living people
People from Bogor